The Wesh–Chaman border crossing is one of the major international border crossings between Afghanistan and Pakistan. Located on the Pak-Afghan border, it leads north from the town of Chaman, Chaman District, Balochistan into Wesh in Spin Boldak District, Kandahar province. More generally, it links the two provincial capitals: Quetta and Kandahar. At least 10 thousand peoples cross this border on the daily basis having businesses in Wesh and return  home in the evening.  On 14 July 2021, the border crossing was captured by Taliban forces as part of the 2021 Taliban offensive.

A brick, double-arched Friendship Gate, rising three stories tall, was erected in 2003. The gate facing towards Balochistan bears the words "Proud Pakistani" and "Pakistan First". Its official hours run from morning to sunset, though smuggling may continue at night.

United States military presence
The Wesh-Chaman border crossing has been used by international forces (ISAF) in Afghanistan as part of a major supply route stretching from the Port of Karachi to Kandahar, with roughly 60 to 100 trucks traversing Chaman daily. On January 18, 2010, ISAF commander General Stanley A. McChrystal visited the site after discussing the crossing's efficiency with Pakistani authorities. A US-run Forward operating base (FOB) was located in Spin Boldak, which monitored the border crossing along with the Afghan Border Police and the Afghan National Army.

References

External links

Afghanistan–Pakistan border crossings
Geography of Balochistan, Pakistan
Chaman District